Monarto Safari Park, formerly known as Monarto Zoological Park and Monarto Zoo, is a  open-range zoo located in South Australia administered by the Royal Zoological Society of South Australia.

The zoo features several unique attractions, including opportunities to get close to lions and cheetahs, and have interactive experiences with meerkats, black rhinoceros and southern white rhinoceros, and see Australia's largest giraffe herd.

History 

The zoo was created in 1983 on land owned by the state government as a closed-to-the-public, purpose breeding area and endangered species sanctuary. In 1990, a study was undertaken to determine the feasibility of allowing public access to the zoo, and by 1993 it had been developed into a large educational facility, open to the public, with bus and walking tours.

Five major habitat exhibits have been developed, including the Asian steppes, arid north Africa, African plains, and Asian grasslands. The entire zoo is surrounded with vermin-proof fencing to keep the habitat as self-contained as possible. The area is not irrigated, and is populated primarily with native flora to cut down on water consumption and erosion in the semi-arid region. The roads and trails within the zoo are constructed of local materials to keep them low maintenance, and to allow them to be easily re-integrated into the habitat should the need arise. Waste water is recycled, and as much as possible, solar power is used for electric fencing needs.

In late 2019, Monarto Zoo began a three-year project to convert itself into a safari park with luxury resort facilities. As part of the overhaul, it is transitioning its branding to be "Monarto Safari Park" by 2021. Monarto would also become the largest park outside of Africa.

Description
Monarto Safari Park is an open-range zoo comprising   administered by the Royal Zoological Society of South Australia (trading as Zoos SA) and located near Monarto, South Australia.

Giraffe breeding programme
 Monarto Zoo had achieved one of the most successful giraffe breeding programs in Oceania, and  has the most successful giraffe breeding programmes in Australia.

Animals & Conservation efforts

Endangered species
The zoo is taking part in numerous conservation efforts with endangered species, and has breeding projects for many Australian native species, including bilby, eastern barred bandicoot, Tasmanian devil, warru (black-footed rock-wallaby) and yellow-footed rock-wallaby; as well as many exotic species (and endangered subspecies of some species) including addax, African wild dog, American bison, Barbary sheep, black rhinoceros, Persian fallow deer, Przewalski's horse, scimitar-horned oryx, South African cheetah and southern white rhinoceros.

In 2006, the zoo began a breeding program for Tasmanian devils which are free of facial tumour disease.

Previously widespread throughout the ranges of central Australia, the warru, or black-footed rock-wallaby, is  South Australia's most endangered mammal, primarily due to predation by foxes and feral cats. However Monarto has had some success in breeding the wallabies since the capture of 15 of them in 2007, and has helped to establish a viable population (22) of the wallabies in a  fenced area, known as the Pintji, in the Anangu Pitjantjatjara Yankunytjatjara (APY) lands. In June 2017 Monarto announced that 25 of the population bred at Pintji, along with 15 others, had been released into the wild. These will be monitored and feral animal control measures are in place.

Ethical products
On-site shops and catering facilities at the zoo actively avoid using products containing palm oil.  Visitors are encouraged to go palm oil free and provided information on how to go about it.

Species list

Bird species include

Emu
Malleefowl
Ostrich
Plains-wanderer
Rufous-crowned emu-wren

Mammal species include

Addax
African lion
African wild dog
American bison
Barbary sheep
Bilby
Black rhinoceros
Blackbuck
Bongo
Cape porcupine
Chapman's zebra
Chimpanzee
Common eland
Eastern barred bandicoot
Giraffe
Greater stick-nest rat
Meerkat
Mitchell's hopping mouse
Nyala
Persian fallow deer
Plains rat
Przewalski’s horse
Red deer
Red-tailed phascogale
Ring-tailed lemur
Scimitar-horned oryx
South African cheetah
Southern white rhinoceros
Spotted hyena
Tammar wallaby
Tasmanian devil
Warru
Waterbuck
Woylie
Yellow-footed rock-wallaby

Reptile species include

Adelaide pygmy blue-tongue lizard
Aldabra giant tortoise
Leopard tortoise
Murray Darling carpet python
Radiated tortoise
Shingleback lizard
Western swamp turtle

See also

Adelaide Zoo
 List of zoos in Australia

References

External links 

Zoos in South Australia
Tourist attractions in South Australia
Entertainment venues in South Australia
1983 establishments in Australia
Parks in South Australia
Zoos established in 1983